Riama inanis is a species of lizard in the family Gymnophthalmidae. It is endemic to Venezuela.

References

Riama
Reptiles of Venezuela
Endemic fauna of Venezuela
Reptiles described in 2003
Taxa named by Tiffany M. Doan
Taxa named by Walter E. Schargel